The Beatles (The Original Studio Recordings), also known as The Beatles: Stereo Box Set, is a box set compilation comprising all remastered recordings by English rock band the Beatles. The set was issued on 9 September 2009, along with the remastered mono recordings and companion The Beatles in Mono and The Beatles: Rock Band video game. The remastering project for both mono and stereo versions was led by EMI senior studio engineers Allan Rouse and Guy Massey. The Stereo Box also features a DVD which contains all the short films that are on the CDs in QuickTime format.

It is the second complete box set collection of original Beatles recordings after The Beatles Box Set (1988). Two earlier album collections, The Beatles Collection (1978) and The Collection (1982) did not contain all of the Beatles' recordings. Although sales were counted as 1 unit for each box set sold in the mono and stereo format, total individual sales exceeded 30 million.

The Beatles (The Original Studio Recordings) received the Grammy Award for Best Historical Album at the 53rd Grammys. The box set was issued on vinyl in 2012.

Album listing
The sixteen-disc collection contains the remastered stereo versions of every album in the Beatles catalogue. The first four albums (Please Please Me, With the Beatles, A Hard Day's Night and Beatles for Sale) made their CD debut in stereo, though most songs from those albums have previously appeared on CD in stereo on various compilations. Both Help! and Rubber Soul use the remixes prepared by George Martin for the original 1987 CD releases (the original 1965 stereo mixes were released on The Beatles in Mono). Magical Mystery Tour is presented in the sequence and artwork of its original North American Capitol Records album release, as opposed to the UK six-song EP.

All CDs replicate their original album labels as first released, from the various Parlophone Records variations, to the Capitol Records label (for Magical Mystery Tour) and the UK Apple Records side A label from Yellow Submarine through Let It Be, and with the side A & side B Apple labels for discs one & two respectively for The Beatles.  For Past Masters, disc one uses a mid-1960s Parlophone label design and disc two uses the (side A) Apple label design. Each of the albums except Past Masters includes a mini-documentary, mainly drawing from The Beatles Anthology (with a few animated 3D scenarios made up of original photos thrown in), about the album in QuickTime format. The Beatles and Past Masters are two-disc sets.

Please Please Me (1963)
With the Beatles (1963)
A Hard Day's Night (1964)
Beatles for Sale (1964)
Help! (1965)
Rubber Soul (1965)
Revolver (1966)
Sgt. Pepper's Lonely Hearts Club Band (1967)
Magical Mystery Tour (1967)
The Beatles (1968)
Yellow Submarine (1969)
Abbey Road (1969)
Let It Be (1970)
Past Masters (1988)

Missing stereo session tapes
No stereo mixes exist for the 1963 single "She Loves You" and its flipside "I'll Get You" or the 1962 single "Love Me Do" and its flipside "P.S. I Love You". It was the practice at Abbey Road Studios prior to early 1963 to wipe and reuse master tapes once they had been mixed down to mono for single release. For this reason there will never be true stereo mixes of "Love Me Do" or "P.S. I Love You". Although the practice had stopped by the time of the release of the "She Loves You" single, and although it is possible that the master tapes were in EMI's possession in January 1964, when the German language version was recorded, it is commonly believed that those tapes were either stolen or destroyed.  Competent-sounding stereo versions of "She Loves You" have been created unofficially using the backing track from "Sie Liebt Dich", but the engineers who prepared the remasters elected not to do this.  Every release of these four songs has been in mono (or simulated stereo) and they appear in mono on the stereo version of Past Masters and Please Please Me. This is also the case for the single version of "Love Me Do" with Ringo Starr on drums but at some point, even the mixed down mono tape of this version of the song was lost. Some authors have expressed the opinion that the original version of "Love Me Do" was intentionally destroyed in order to alleviate possible confusion between it and the more common version of the song. Since 1980, new transfers sourced from reasonably clean 45rpm mono singles from private collectors have been used as the master for this version of the song.

Two other songs in the Beatles' catalogue which also appear in mono on the stereo CDs are "Only a Northern Song" and "You Know My Name (Look Up the Number)". Neither of these songs received stereo mixes at the time they were recorded, although other songs that were similarly not mixed into stereo during The Beatles' recording lifetime were not excluded from the set: the stereo mixes of "Strawberry Fields Forever", "Penny Lane" and "Baby, You're a Rich Man" all made in 1971, the stereo mix of "Yes It Is" that was given a very limited UK release in 1986 on a mail order cassette promotion that Apple and the Beatles did not authorise and was commercially released in 1988 on Past Masters; and the 2000 edit of "Day Tripper" from 1. "Only a Northern Song" was first mixed into stereo and 5.1 surround for the Yellow Submarine Songtrack album in 1999 and a differently-edited stereo mix of "You Know My Name (Look Up the Number)" appeared on Anthology 2 in 1996. "You Know My Name (Look Up the Number)" is the only track left in the Beatles' catalogue of which the original edit has never received a stereo mix despite the multi-tracks being available.

Bonus features
Included in the set is a DVD called The Mini Documentaries compiling all the short documentaries released on the individual albums in QuickTime format. The DVD features narration from all four Beatles as well as George Martin as the opening on each of the individual albums. Each documentary contains rare footage and previously unheard dialogue. There are sound excerpts from various songs, accompanied by still photos, clips of television appearances, footage from inside recording sessions, film footage from their final photo session, and material from the five Beatles films A Hard Day's Night, Help!, Magical Mystery Tour, Yellow Submarine, and Let It Be. The DVD has a red Apple label (similar to that on the original US Let It Be LP). This DVD is exclusive to the Stereo set, and is not included in the Mono version.

Limited edition USB flash drive

On 7 December 2009, The Beatles (The Original Studio Recordings) was also released as a limited edition of 30,000 apple-shaped USB flash drives. This event marks the first appearance for the Beatles catalogue in a high-resolution digital format being encoded in 44.1 kHz/24-bit FLAC format. CD-standard is 44.1 kHz/16-bit. The 16 GB flash drive also includes 320 kbps MP3 copies of the albums, a specially designed Flash interface, and all the visual elements from the boxed set – the mini-documentary films, original UK album art, rare photos and expanded liner notes.

Although it received positive reviews from critics and users, many complaints were received about the "stem" on the flash drive snapping off when attempting to remove it out of the apple-shaped holder.

Vinyl
On 12 November 2012, the set was released on 180-gram vinyl, specially prepared for vinyl, with a 252-page book included. Also included are the inserts which were included in the original LPs such as the cardboard cutout sheet included in Sgt. Pepper plus the photos and poster included in The Beatles.

Chart performance

On the United States Billboard Top 200 albums chart the set debuted at number 15. On the Japanese Oricon weekly album charts, it debuted at number 6, selling over 35,000 copies in its first week. The set was certified triple platinum by the RIAA in April 2010. The set was also certified Diamond in Canada in March 2010.

In Germany, the box set reached number 37.

Year-end charts

Subsequent releases
The 1973 greatest hits albums 1962–1966 and 1967–1970 were re-released and remastered by the same team behind those who remastered the Beatles' Stereo and Mono box sets. 1 and Yellow Submarine Songtrack have also received re-releases akin to the presentation of the 2009 remasters.

The same remastering team have also remastered all of John Lennon's studio albums plus Paul McCartney's solo albums reissued by Hear Music, as well as a handful of other albums released on Apple Records.

See also
Other complete or near-complete collections of Beatles music:
The Beatles Collection (1978)
The Beatles Box (1980)
The Beatles: The Collection (1982)
The Beatles Mono Collection (1982)
The Beatles Box Set (1988)
The Beatles in Mono (2009)

References

External links
The Beatles official website press release
Details of Beatles Remasters

2009 compilation albums
The Beatles compilation albums
Apple Records compilation albums
Capitol Records compilation albums
Albums produced by George Martin
Albums produced by Phil Spector
Albums recorded at Apple Studios
Albums recorded at Trident Studios
Albums recorded at Olympic Sound Studios
Albums arranged by George Martin
Albums arranged by George Harrison
Albums arranged by Mike Leander
Albums arranged by John Lennon
Albums arranged by Paul McCartney
Albums conducted by George Martin
Albums conducted by George Harrison
Albums conducted by John Lennon
Albums conducted by Paul McCartney
Grammy Award for Best Historical Album
Reissue albums
Compilation albums published posthumously